Roger De Vlaeminck (born 24 August 1947) is a Belgian former professional racing cyclist. He was described by Rik Van Looy as "The most talented and the only real classics rider of his generation". Nicknamed "The Gypsy" because he was born into a family of traveling clothiers, he is known for exploits in the cobbled classic Paris–Roubaix race, but his performances in other "Monument" races gave him a record that few can match. His record in Paris–Roubaix earned him another nickname, "Monsieur Paris–Roubaix" (English: "Mr. Paris–Roubaix").

Early life and amateur career
De Vlaeminck was born on 24 August 1947 in the East Flanders town of Eeklo, His first love was football. At the age of 16 he debuted for F.C. Eeklo. He could have made a career in the sport, however his elder brother Erik was having success as a pro cyclist and this persuaded Roger to try cycling. He raced as a junior in 1965, gaining one win, but 1966 saw 25 victories. Roger and Erik spent their winters riding cyclo-cross. In Luxembourg in 1968, Erik became world professional champion and Roger the amateur champion on the same day. Roger eventually took the professional title in 1975.

In 1968 De Vlaeminck rode the road race at the 1968 Summer Olympics in Mexico and finished 18th.

Professional career

De Vlaeminck turned professional at the start of the 1969 season with Flandria-Declerck and won the Omloop "Het Volk" in his first race. De Vlaeminck's career ran parallel with Eddy Merckx and he battled for ascendancy with Merckx throughout his career. De Vlaeminck rode Paris–Roubaix on 14 occasions, winning four times (1972, 1974, 1975, 1977), finished second four times, third once, fifth once, sixth once, seventh twice and abandoned only in 1980. His skills as a cyclo-cross rider made him an expert on the cobbles of northern France which the race crosses. De Vlaeminck used the early season Italian stage race Tirreno–Adriatico as training for the spring classics. He dominated the race between 1972 and 1977, winning every edition and taking 15 stages. His six victories are the most of all time and no other rider has won the race more than twice.

De Vlaeminck is one of only three riders to have won all five 'Monuments of Cycling' (i.e., Milan–San Remo, Tour of Flanders, Paris–Roubaix, Liège–Bastogne–Liège, and the Giro di Lombardia). The other two are fellow Belgians Rik van Looy and Eddy Merckx. All total De Vlaeminck won 11 Monument races, and finished in the top ten on an additional 25 occasions. The only major one-day race he did not win was the world road race championship, his best performance was second to Dutchman Hennie Kuiper in 1975.

He rode three Tours de France, winning stage 6 in 1970 between Amiens and Valenciennes. De Vlaeminck took the points jersey in the Giro d'Italia on three occasions as well as 22 stages overall including seven stages in 1975. He took a stage win in the Vuelta a España in his final season in 1984. His career lasted 15 years and he eventually had 259 road race victories. He always kept active in cyclo-cross, resulting in 70 cyclo-cross victories and a world title in 1975. De Vlaeminck also had a few successes on track, with several podium finishes in Six-Day races and a national Madison title in 1972 alongside Patrick Sercu. This makes him the only cyclist who won a Belgian national championship in road cycling, cyclo-cross and track cycling.

Rivalry with Merckx 
In 1970, Rik Van Looy ended his career and many fans then focused on Roger De Vlaeminck as his successor. Another young rider who could succeed Van Looy was Eddy Merckx. When the professional careers of both riders had just started, De Vlaeminck always wanted to beat Merckx. He was even disappointed if someone else came in second, because then people could say he had no opposition. After racing against each other for a number of years, the two started to think differently about each other. De Vlaeminck gained respect for Merckx's performance and Merckx appreciated that his competitor always fought him with an open mind.

De Vlaeminck also believes that there were others who benefited from the competition between him and Merckx. He often restricted his competitor, but this cost so much strength that someone else took advantage of it. De Vlaeminck also says that he could have won some races if Merckx had not participated, but in other races he drove better because he never wanted to be inferior to his competitor.

Ultimately, De Vlaeminck named his son Eddy De Vlaeminck, after his competitor.

Post-career

De Vlaeminck, who lives on a farm in Kaprijke, is still in cycling. He has been coaching cyclo-cross riders. In April 2004 he quit his job as coach to the John Saey-Deschacht team in Belgium to spend more time with his family, However he was tempted back to the sport in November 2004 as advisor to the Zimbabwe team as it prepared for the world championship in St. Wendel, Germany, at the end of January 2005.

De Vlaeminck is known for firm opinions about cycling and is often consulted by journalists. In particular, he criticizes the trend to have multiple leaders in a team. That, he says, means the best racers share important races between them. De Vlaeminck is also known for his harsh opinion of Tom Boonen, calling him unworthy of equaling his Paris–Roubaix record of 4 wins, claiming cycling isn't as hard as it used to be. This led to the meme "In den tijd van Roger De Vlaeminck ..." ("in the days of Roger De Vlaeminck") where De Vlaeminck was attributed to doing all kinds of unrealistic stuff.

Major results

Road 

1967
 1st Stage 4 Amateur Tour of Belgium
 1st Stage 4 Tour de la province de Namur
 3rd  Belgian National Road Race Championships Amateurs
 7th Road race, UCI Road World Amateur Championships
1968
 1st  Road race, National Amateur Road Championships
 1st Overall Amateur Tour of Belgium
1st Stage 8
 1st La Flèche Ardennaise
 10th Overall Tour de l'Avenir
1st  Points classification
1st Stages 10a & 10b
1969
 1st  Road race, National Road Championships
 1st Omloop Het Volk
 1st Brussels–Ingooigem
 1st Stage 3 Tour of Belgium
 1st Omloop Schelde-Durme
 1st LuK Challenge Chrono (with Herman Vanspringel)
 1st Kampioenschap van Oost-Vlaanderen
 1st Ronde van West-Vlaanderen
 2nd Milan–San Remo
 2nd Gent–Wevelgem
 2nd Omloop der Zennevallei
 2nd Grote Prijs Jef Scherens
 3rd GP Stad Vilvoorde
 3rd Züri–Metzgete
 3rd Overall Paris-Luxembourg
 3rd Wattrelos-Meulebeke
 5th Paris–Roubaix
 6th La Flèche Wallonne
1970
 1st Liège–Bastogne–Liège
 1st Kuurne–Brussels–Kuurne
 1st Grote Scheldeprijs
 1st Druivenkoers Overijse
 1st Omloop van het Houtland
 1st Stage 6 Tour de France
 4th Overall Critérium du Dauphiné Libéré
1st  Points classification
1st Stage 4
 1st Geraardsbergen-Viane
 1st Prologue (TTT) Four Days of Dunkirk
 2nd Paris–Roubaix
 2nd E3 Prijs Vlaanderen
 3rd Wattrelos-Meulebeke
 3rd GP Roeselare
 5th Paris–Tours
 8th Omloop Het Volk
1971
 1st  Overall Four Days of Dunkirk
1st Stage 2
 Tour de Suisse
1st  Points classification
 1st Stage 3
 1st La Flèche Wallonne
 1st E3 Prijs Vlaanderen
 1st Kuurne–Brussels–Kuurne
 1st Omloop van het Zuidwesten
 1st Stage 1 & 4 Tour de la Nouvelle France
 1st Omloop van de Westkust 
 2nd Gent–Wevelgem
 3rd Overall Vuelta a Andalucía
 1st  Mountains classification
 1st Stage 1 & 6
 3rd Brabantse Pijl
 4th Overall Tour de Suisse
1st Stage 3
 7th Paris–Roubaix
 8th Giro di Lombardia
1972
 1st  Overall Tirreno–Adriatico
1st Stages 4 & 5b
 1st Paris–Roubaix
 1st Milano–Torino
 1st Druivenkoers Overijse
 1st Coppa Placci
 1st Gran Premio Città di Camaiore
 1st Halse Pijl
 1st Stage 1 Giro di Sardegna
 3rd Grand Prix Pino Cerami
 4th Paris–Tours
 4th Trofeo Laigueglia
 7th Overall Giro d'Italia
1st  Points classification
1st Stages 6, 15, 18 & 19a
 10th Sassari-Cagliari
1973
 1st  Overall Tirreno–Adriatico
1st  Mountains Classification
1st Stage 5a
 1st Milan–San Remo
 Giro d'Italia
1st Stages 2, 11 & 13
 1st Giro di Toscana
 1st Trofeo Matteotti
 1st Boucles de l'Aulne
 1st Omloop van het Zuidwesten
 1st Grand Prix de Monaco
 2nd Giro di Lombardia
 2nd Paris–Tours
 2nd Coppa Bernocchi
 2nd Coppa Sabatini
 2nd Omloop Het Volk
 2nd Trofeo Laigueglia
 2nd Omloop der Zennevallei
 3rd Omloop van de Westkust
 3rd Milano–Torino
 4th Coppa Placci
 6th Overall Giro di Sardegna
 1st Stage 3 & 6
 7th Paris–Roubaix
 8th Brabantse Pijl
1974
 1st  Overall Tirreno–Adriatico
1st Stage 5
 1st Paris–Roubaix
 1st Giro di Lombardia
 Giro d'Italia
1st  Points classification
1st Stage 4
 1st Druivenkoers Overijse
 1st Giro del Veneto
 1st Milano–Torino
 1st Coppa Placci
 1st Giro di Sicilia
 1st Stage 2 Giro di Puglia
 2nd Cronostafetta 
 2nd GP Montelupo
 2nd Giro dell'Emilia
 2nd Ronde van Limburg
 2nd Paris–Brussels
 2nd La Flèche Wallonne
 2nd Giro della Provincia di Reggio Calabria
 2nd Overall Super Prestige Pernod International
 3rd Milan–San Remo
 3rd Boucles de l'Aulne
 3rd Coppa Ugo Agostoni
 3rd Gent–Wevelgem
 3rd Grand Prix de Wallonie
 3rd Trofeo Baracchi (with Eddy Merckx)
 3rd Gran Premio di Lugano
 3rd Grand Prix de Wallonie
 4th Giro del Lazio
 7th Paris–Tours
1975
 1st  Overall Tour de Suisse
1st  Points classification
1st Prologue & Stages 1, 3, 5, 9 & 10 (ITT)
 1st  Overall Tirreno–Adriatico
1st Stages 2, 4 & 5
 1st Paris–Roubaix
 1st Züri–Metzgete
 1st Coppa Ugo Agostoni
 1st GP Montelupo
 1st Giro del Lazio
 1st Trofeo Pantalica
 1st Critérium des As
 1st GP Industria & Artigianato di Larciano
 1st Omloop van Neeroeteren
 1st Heusden Koers
 2nd  Road race, UCI Road World Championships
 2nd Grote Prijs Marcel Kint
 2nd Paris–Tours
 2nd Milano–Torino
 2nd Overall Super Prestige Pernod International
 3rd Druivenkoers Overijse
 3rd Trofeo Laigueglia
 3rd Giro di Toscana
 3rd Paris–Tours
 3rd Milano–Torino
 4th Overall Giro d'Italia
1st  Points classification
1st Stages 4, 6, 7b, 10, 11, 18 & 20
 4th Giro di Lombardia
 4th Grote Scheldeprijs
 4th Omloop Het Volk
 5th Tre Valli Varesine
 7th Giro dell'Emilia
 8th Liège–Bastogne–Liège
 10th Overall Giro di Sardegna
1st Stages 1, 4 & 6
1976
 1st  Overall Tirreno–Adriatico
1st  Points classification
1st Stages 3, 4 & 5b
 5th Overall Volta a Catalunya
1st  Points classification
1st Prologue & Stages 2 & 4
 1st  Overall Giro di Sardegna
1st Stages 1b & 5
 1st Giro di Lombardia
 1st Giro dell'Emilia
 Giro d'Italia
1st Stages 2, 5, 8 & 16
 1st Giro del Lazio
 1st Coppa Ugo Agostoni
 1st GP Montelupo
 1st Stage 3 Giro di Puglia
 1st Sassari-Cagliari
 2nd Overall Tour de Romandie
1st  Points classification
1st Stage 5a
 2nd Giro delle Marche
 2nd Tre Valli Varesine
 2nd Grote Scheldeprijs
 2nd Züri–Metzgete
 2nd Trofeo Pantalica
 3rd Paris–Roubaix
 3rd Rund um den Henninger Turm
 3rd Giro di Campania
 4th Tour of Flanders
 5th Coppa Placci
 6th Gent–Wevelgem
 6th E3 Prijs Vlaanderen
 7th Milan–San Remo
1977
 1st  Overall Tirreno–Adriatico
1st Stages 2 & 3
 1st Paris–Roubaix
 1st Tour of Flanders
 1st Giro del Piemonte
 2nd Milan–San Remo
 2nd Giro del Veneto
 2nd Giro di Toscana
 2nd Overall Super Prestige Pernod International
 2nd Challenge Gan
 4th Liège–Bastogne–Liège
 4th Paris–Tours
 4th Paris–Brussels
 6th Amstel Gold Race
 6th Coppa Bernocchi
 8th Omloop Het Volk
 7th Tre Valli Varesine
1978
 1st Milan–San Remo
 Giro di Sardegna
1st  Points classification
1st Stages 1 & 5
 1st Druivenkoers Overijse
 1st Giro del Friuli
 1st Stage 4 Giro di Puglia
 1st Sassari-Cagliari
 2nd Boucles de l'Aulne
 2nd Paris–Roubaix
 3rd Giro del Lazio
 5th Coppa Ugo Agostoni
 6th Gent–Wevelgem
 8th Züri–Metzgete
 8th Brabantse Pijl
 10th Tour of Flanders
 10th Road race, UCI Road World Championships
1979
 1st  Overall Giro di Puglia
1st Stages 1, 2 & 3
 1st  Overall Four Days of Dunkirk
1st Stages 4a & 5b
 1st Milan–San Remo
 Giro d'Italia
1st Stages 2, 9 & 12
 1st Omloop Het Volk
 1st Milano–Vignola
 1st Erpe-Mere
 1st Gran Premio Bruno Beghelli
 2nd Giro del Friuli
 2nd Paris–Roubaix
 2nd Gent–Wevelgem
 3rd Overall Giro del Trentino
1st Stage 1
 3rd Tre Valli Varesine
 4th Züri–Metzgete
 6th Overall Tirreno–Adriatico
 1st Stage 5a 
 7th Coppa Ugo Agostoni
 10th Road race, UCI Road World Championships
1980
 1st  Overall Giro di Sardegna
1st Stages 1, 2a, 4 & 5
 1st  Overall Vuelta a Mallorca
1st Prologue & Stages 1 & 4
 Tirreno–Adriatico
1st Stages 1 & 2
 1st Trofeo Laigueglia
 1st Stage 1 Four Days of Dunkirk
 1st Profronde van Stiphout
 1st Stages 1 & 2 Deutschland Tour
 1st Heusden Koers
 2nd Liedekerkse Pijl
 4th Tour of Flanders
 5th Milan–San Remo
 5th Omloop Het Volk
 5th Coppa Bernocchi
 6th Grote Scheldeprijs
 6th Coppa Ugo Agostoni
 7th Road race, UCI Road World Championships
1981
 1st  Road race, National Road Championships
 1st Paris–Brussels
 1st Brabantse Pijl
 1st Profronde van Stiphout
 Tour de Suisse
1st Stages 2 & 3a
 Paris–Nice
1st Stages 2a & 4
 1st Omloop van de Grensstreek
 2nd Gent–Wevelgem
 2nd Milan–San Remo
 2nd Paris–Roubaix
 2nd Amstel Gold Race
 2nd Overall Super Prestige Pernod International
 3rd Trofeo Laigueglia
 5th Kuurne–Brussels–Kuurne
 6th Tour of Flanders
1982
 2nd E3 Prijs Vlaanderen
 6th Paris–Roubaix
 7th Overall Three Days of De Panne
 7th Liège–Bastogne–Liège
 7th Trofeo Laigueglia
1983
 2nd GP Dr. Eugeen Roggeman
1984
 1st Stage 8 Vuelta a España
 1st Giro di Campania
 1st Cronostafetta
 1st Stage 5 Coppi e Bartali
 3rd Milano–Torino
 3rd Giro della Provincia di Reggio Calabria

Cyclo-cross

1967
 2nd  Belgian National Cyclo-cross Championships
1968
 1st  UCI Amateur CX World Championships
 1st  National CX Championships Amateurs
 1st Noordzeecross
1969
 1st  National CX Championships Amateurs
 1st Duinencross Koksijde
 2nd  UCI Amateur CX World Championships
 2nd  National CX Championships
1970
 1st Druivencross Overijse
 3rd Superprestige Niel
1972
 1st Duinencross Koksijde
 1st Druivencross Overijse
1974
 1st  National CX Championships
 1st Druivencross Overijse
 2nd  UCI CX World Championships
1975
 1st  UCI World CX Championships
 1st  National CX Championships
 3rd Druivencross Overijse
1978
 1st  National CX Championships
 1st Druivencross Overijse
1979
 1st Superprestige Diegem
 2nd  National CX Championships
1981
 1st Superprestige Diegem

Track

1970
 2nd Six Days of Ghent (with Peter Post)
1971
 1st Six Days of Ghent (with Patrick Sercu)
 2nd Six Days of Brussels (with Patrick Sercu)
1972
Belgian National Championships
1st  Madison (with Patrick Sercu)
1979
 2nd Six Days of Antwerp (with Patrick Sercu and Rik Van Linden)
1980
 1st Six Days of Antwerp (with René Pijnen and Wilfried Peffgen)
 2nd Six Days of Milan (with Alfons De Wolf)
1982
 1st Six Days of Antwerp (with Patrick Sercu)
 3rd Six Days of Ghent (with Patrick Sercu)

Monuments results timeline
Source:

Records 

 Most Tirreno–Adriatico wins: 6 in 1972, 1973, 1974, 1975, 1976 and 1977
 Most Paris–Roubaix wins: 4 1972, 1974, 1975 and 1977 (record shared with Tom Boonen)
 Most Druivenkoers Overijse wins: 4 1970, 1972, 1974 and 1978 (record shared with Björn Leukemans)
 The only professional who won a national championship in road cycling (1969, 1981), cyclo-cross (1974, 1975, 1978) and track cycling (1972)

Awards and honours 

 Mendrisio d'Or: 1975
 Winner of 7 of the 8 Classic cycle races (shared with Eddy Merckx). Rik van Looy won all 8.
 Union Cycliste Internationale Hall of Fame: 2002
 UCI Top 100: 19th place
 Procyclingstats.com – All Time Wins Ranking: 3rd place (161 wins, shared with Mario Chipollini)
 CyclingRanking – Overall ranking: 8th place

See also

 List of riders with stage wins at all three cycling Grand Tours
 Belgium at the UCI Cyclo-cross World Championships
 Belgium at the UCI Road World Championships
 Cycling records
 A Sunday in Hell
 List of Belgians

Notes

References

Further reading

External links

 
 Complete palmares 
 
 

1947 births
Living people
Belgian male cyclists
Belgian Tour de France stage winners
Belgian Giro d'Italia stage winners
Belgian Vuelta a España stage winners
Cyclo-cross cyclists
Cyclists from East Flanders
UCI Cyclo-cross World Champions (men)
Tour de Suisse stage winners
Olympic cyclists of Belgium
Cyclists at the 1968 Summer Olympics
People from Eeklo
Belgian cyclo-cross champions
Romani sportspeople